These are the official results of the Men's Shot Put event at the 1990 European Championships in Split, Yugoslavia, held at Stadion Poljud on 28 and 29 August 1990. There were a total number of nineteen participating athletes.

Medalists

Final

†: Vyacheslav Lykho ranked initially 3rd (20.81m), but was disqualified for infringement of IAAF doping rules.

Qualification

†: Vyacheslav Lykho initially reached the final (19.88m), but was disqualified later for infringement of IAAF doping rules.

Participation
According to an unofficial count, 19 athletes from 10 countries participated in the event.

 (1)
 (3)
 (1)
 (3)
 (1)
 (1)
 (3)
 (1)
 (3)
 (2)

See also
 1988 Men's Olympic Shot Put (Seoul)
 1990 Shot Put Year Ranking
 1991 Men's World Championships Shot Put (Tokyo)
 1992 Men's Olympic Shot Put (Barcelona)
 1994 Men's European Championships Shot Put (Helsinki)

References

 Results

Shot put
Shot put at the European Athletics Championships